Bonsal can mean:

Places
Bonsal, North Carolina, a community in North Carolina, United States
Bonsal, Ehekirchen, part of the municipality of Ehekirchen in Upper Bavaria, Germany
Bonsal Nature Reserve, nature reserve in the township of Montclair, New Jersey, United States

Persons
Dudley Baldwin Bonsal (1906 – 1995), United States federal judge
Frank A. Bonsal, United States jockey and horse trainer
Philip Wilson Bonsal (1903 - 1995), United States diplomat
Stephen Bonsal (1865 - 1951),  United States war correspondent, historian, essayist, diplomat and translator

See also
Bonsall (disambiguation)